The 2009–10 SV Werder Bremen II season started on 25 July 2009 against Rot-Weiß Erfurt and finished on 8 May 2010 against Erzgebirge Aue.

Season

Season review

July and August
The opening match of the season happened on 25 July 2009 against Rot-Weiß Erfurt. The match finished in a 0–0 draw. Matchday two happened on 28 July 2009 against VfL Osnabrück. Osnabrück won the match 1–0 with a goal from the penalty spot from Matthias Heidrich. Matchday three happened on 7 August 2009 against Borussia Dortmund II. Werder Bremen II won the match 1–0 with a goal from Torsten Oehrl. Matchday four happened on 15 August 2009 against Holstein Kiel. Holstein Kiel won the match 4–0 with three goals from Michael Holt and a goal from Fiete Sykora. Matchday five happened on 22 August 2009 against Wacker Burghausen. Wacker Burghausen won the match 4–3. Onur Ayık, Torsten Oehrl, and Pascal Testroet scored for Werder Bremen II. Wacker Burghausen got two goals from Christian Cappek and a goal each from Björn Hertl and Sven Kresin. Matchday six happened on 30 August 2010 against Eintracht Braunschweig. Werder Bremen II won the match 2–1. Pascal Testroet scored two goals for Werder Bremen II and Dennis Kruppke scored for Eintracht Braunschweig.

September and October
Matchday seven happened on 2 September 2009 against Jahn Regensburg. Jahn Regensburg won the match 1–0 with a goal from Anton Shynder. Matchday nine happened on 12 September 2009 against FC Ingolstadt 04. Ingolstadt won the match 4–1. Torsten Oehrl scored for Werder Bremen II. Ingolstadt got two goals from Stefan Leitl, and a goal each from Moritz Hartmann and Robert Braber. Matchday eight happened on 15 September 2009 against Kickers Offenbach. Kickers Offenbach won the match 1–0 with a goal from David Ulm. Matchday 10 happened on 19 September 2009 against SpVgg Unterhaching.  Werder Bremen II won the match 3–1. Werder Bremen II got two goals from Onur Ayık and a goal from Nicolas Feldhahn. Ömer Kanca scored for Unterhaching. Felix Schiller was sent-off during the match. Matchday 11 happened on 26 September 2009 against Carl Zeiss Jena. The match finished in a 2–2 draw. Pascal Testroet scored two goals for Werder Bremen II. Orlando Smeekes and Salvatore Amirante scored for Carl Zeiss Jena. Matchday 12 happened on 3 October 2009 against Dynamo Dresden. Werder Bremen II won the match 2–0 with two goals from Torsten Oehrl. Matchday 13 happened on 17 October 2009 against 1. FC Heidenheim. Werder Bremen II won the match 2–1. Pascal Testroet scored two goals for Werder Bremen II. Dieter Jarosch scored for Heidenheim. Matchday 14 happened on 24 October 2009 against Wuppertaler SV. Wuppertal won the match 1–0 with a goal from Andrés Formento. Matchday 15 happened on 30 October 2009 against VfB Stuttgart II. Werder Bremen II won the match 1–0 with a goal from Onur Ayık.

November and December
Matchday 16 happened on 7 November 2009 against Wehen Wiesbaden. Werder Bremen II won the match 5–0 with two goals from Addy-Waku Menga and a goal each from Pascal Testroet, Stefan Ronneburg, and Onur Ayık. Matchday 17 happened on 21 November 2009 against SV Sandhausen. The match finished in a 2–2 draw. Addy-Waku Menga scored two goals for Werder Bremen II. Philipp Hosiner and Regis Dorn scored for Sandhausen. Matchday 18 happened on 29 November 2009 against Bayern Munich II. Bayern Munich II won the match 3–0 with two goals from Mehmet Ekici and a goal from Saër Sène. Matchday 19 happened on 5 December 2009 against Erzgebirge Aue. Erzgebirge Aue won the match 2–1. Torsten Oehrl scored for Werder Bremen II. Sebastian Glasner and Jan Hochscheidt scored for Erzgebirge Aue. Alexander Hessel was sent-off during the match. Matchday 20 happened on 12 December 2009 against Rot-Weiß Erfurt. The match finished in a 1–1 draw. Onur Ayık scored for Werder Bremen II and Petr Smíšek scored for Rot-Weiß Erfurt.

March
Matchday 23 happened on 3 March 2010 against Holstein Kiel. Werder Bremen II won the match 6–1. Matchday 27 happened on 6 March 2010 against Kickers Offenbach. Werder Bremen II got three goals from Onur Ayık and a goal each from Addy-Waku Menga, Kevin Artmann, and Lennart Thy. Michael Holt scored for Holstein Kiel. Kickers Offenbach won the match 4–0 with two goals from Steffen Haas and a goal each from Kai Hesse and Nils Pfingsten-Reddig. Matchday 22 happened on 10 March 2010 against Borussia Dortmund II. Werder Bremen II won the match 2–1. Tobias Kempe scored two goals for Werder Bremen II. Kempe's first goal was from the penalty spot. Uwe Hünemeier scored from the penalty spot for Burussia Dortmund II. Matchday 28 happened on 13 March 2010 against Ingolstadt. The match finished in a 0–0 draw. Matchday 21 happened on 16 March 2010 against Osnabrück. Osnabrück won the match 1–0 with a goal from Alexander Dercho. Matchday 21 happened on 21 March 2010 against Unterhaching. Werder Bremen II won the match 1–0 with a goal from Nicolas Feldhahn. Markus Schwabl was sent-off during the match. Matchday 24 happened on 24 March 2010 against Wacker Burghausen. The match finished in a 1–1 draw. Lennart Thy scored for Werder Bremen II and Christian Holzer scored for Wacker Burghausen. Matchday 30 happened on 28 March 2010 against Carl Zeiss Jena. Carl Zeiss Jena won the match 2–1. Kevin Artmann scored for Werder Bremen II. Orlando Smeekes and Melvin Holwijn scored for Carl Zeiss Jena. Márkó Futács was sent-off during the match. Matchday 31 happened on 31 March 2010 against Dynamo Dresden. Dynamo Dresden won the match 1–0 with a goal from Robert Koch.

April and May
Matchday 32 happened on 3 April 2010 against Heidenheim. The matchday finished in a 1–1 draw. Onur Ayık scored for Werder Bremen II and Andreas Spann scored for Heidenheim. Stefan Ronneburg was sent-off during the match. Matchday 25 happened on 7 April 2010 against Eintracht Braunschweig. Eintracht Braunschweig won the match 3–0 with goals from Deniz Doğan, Damir Vrančić, and Marco Calamita. Matchday 33 happened on 10 April 2010 against Wuppertal. The match finished in a 1–1 draw. Sandro Wagner scored for Werder Bremen II and Nermin Čeliković scored for Wuppertal. Matchday 34 happened on 13 April 2010 against Stuttgart II. Stuttgart II won the match 3–0 with goals from Tobias Rathgeb, who scored from the penalty spot, Julian Schieber, and Sven Schipplock. Matchday 35 happened on 17 April 2010 against Wehen Wiesbaden. Wehen Wiesbaden won the match 2–0 with goals from Dominik Stroh-Engel and Aykut Öztürk. Matchday 26 happened on 20 April 2010 against Jahn Regensburg. Werder Bremen II won the match 4–1. Werder Bremen II got three goals from Márkó Futács and a goal from Sandro Wagner. Petr Stoilov scored for Jahn Regensburg. Matchday 36 happened on 24 April 2010 against Sandhausen. Werder Bremen II won the match 3–0 with goals from Timo Perthel, Sandro Wagner, and Onur Ayık. Matchday 37 happened on 30 April 2010 against Bayern Munich II. Bayern Munich II won the match 2–1. Nicolas Feldhahn scored for Werder Bremen II. Deniz Yılmaz and Saër Sène scored for Bayern Munich II. Matchday 38 happened on 8 May 2010 against Erzgebirge Aue. Werder Bremen II won the match 2–1. Nicolas Feldhahn and Tobias Kempe scored for  Werder Bremen II. Sebastian Glasner scored for Erzgebirge Aue.

Results summary

Results

Squad statistics

References

Werder Bremen II, SV
SV Werder Bremen II seasons